Trinidad and Tobago made its Paralympic Games début at the 1984 Summer Paralympics in Stoke Mandeville and New York. For its first participation, the country sent eight athletes (seven men and one woman) to compete in athletics, swimming and weightlifting. Its three medals (two gold and a bronze) were all won by the same athlete, Rachael Marshall. The country competed again in the 1988 Summer Games, with a reduced delegation of four athletes (all men), in athletics, table tennis and weightlifting. They won no medals. Trinidad and Tobago returned to the Paralympics in 2012, and has never participated in the Winter Paralympics.

The country's three medals (of which two gold) place it 72nd on the all-time Paralympic Games medal table.

Medallists

See also
 Trinidad and Tobago at the Olympics

References